Christopher or Chris Parkinson may refer to:

Christopher Parkinson (MP) for Berwick-upon-Tweed (UK Parliament constituency)
 Chris Parkinson (musician), British folk musician
 Chris Parkinson (poet), British poet and prankster
 Chris Parkinson (broadcaster), New Zealand broadcaster